Intelligence requirements are the listing of intelligence priorities by officials, usually part of a "threat assessment". As former Secretary of State Dean Rusk once said "Providence has not provided human beings with the capacity to pierce the fog of the future." Once an intelligence requirement is identified, it is the responsibility of the decision maker's intel staff or if requested, supporting intel organization(s), to collect and disseminate the required information.  The identification of intelligence requirements and the collection and dissemination of the required information are parts of the intelligence cycle.

Intelligence assessment